Alberto Pedro "Beto" Cabrera (also nicknamed Mago or Mandrake because of his playing skills) (December 16, 1945 – August 12, 2000) was an Argentine basketball player. At club level, Cabrera won 17 championships with his former club, Estudiantes de Bahía Blanca and 12 titles playing for the Bahía Blanca City team. He also played 8 years for the Argentina national team, being also its captain.

Cabrera had been considered the best Argentine basketball player ever before the huge success achieved by Manu Ginóbili playing at the NBA. Cabrera was also named Sportsman of the 20th Century by his born town, Bahía Blanca, in 1999. This city is also considered "Capital Nacional del Básquet#" (National Capital City of Basketball) in Argentina due to the popularity of that sport there.

Basketball career

Cabrera was born on December 16, 1945, in Bahía Blanca and started to play at 7 years old in Estudiantes de Bahía Blanca. Although he had not a stylized physique, his first movements on the field showed that Cabrera was specially skilled to control and pass the ball and he was also able to defend, being an outstanding blocker due to his timing to jump. He was not only a strategist but a great scorer, achieving an average of 28 points in one season. Moreover, his experience after many years of career and his permanent interest in the game made Cabrera deserver of nicknames such as "El Mago" (The Magician, in Spanish).

His debut in Primera División was on November 30, 1961. In 1963 Cabrera won his first title with Estudiantes, defeating 49-42 to Independiente in the final game. He was only 17.

During the 1970s, Estudiantes (led by Cabrera) played some of the most relevant games against arch-rival Olimpo, with Atilio Fruet as its most notable player. Cabrera and Fruet would become rivals inside the court and friends outside.

Cabrera also played 8 years for the Argentina national basketball team, with a total of 16 matches disputed. His debut was in the Mundial Extra hosted in Chile in 1966, playing then the 1967 and 1974 FIBA World Championships which took place in Uruguay and Puerto Rico, respectively. His score average was 11,5 points.

On January 16, 1984, Cabrera retired from the activity winning a Torneo Bahiense championship. He died of leukemia on August 12, 2000.

Honors and awards

Championships
Club
 Estudiantes (BB)
 Torneo Oficial (5): 1965, 1970, 1974, 1975, 1982, 1983
 Torneo Bahiense (12): 1962, 1963, 1966, 1967, 1970, 1971, 1972, 1974, 1975, 1980, 1982, 1983
Special teams
 Bahia Blanca city team
 Torneo Bonaerense (12): 1964, 1965, 1966, 1967, 1968, 1969, 1970, 1971, 1973, 1974, 1975, 1978
 Buenos Aires province team:
 Torneo Argentino (9): 1966, 1967, 1969, 1970, 1971, 1972, 1973, 1976, 1979
National team
 Argentina
 Campeonato Sudamericano (1): 1979

Awards and recognition
 Olimpia de Plata (for basketball player of the year in Argentina): 3 (1970, 1973, 1974)
 "Sportsman of the 20th Century", named by his home town, Bahia Blanca, in 1999
 N° 14 retired by Estudiantes de Bahía Blanca on October 3, 2004
 Total Games played: 724

References

1945 births
Sportspeople from Bahía Blanca
Argentine men's basketball players
1967 FIBA World Championship players
1974 FIBA World Championship players
Point guards
Estudiantes de Bahía Blanca basketball players
2000 deaths